Willard C. Drumm (October 1, 1897 – June 6, 1983) was an American politician who served in the New York State Assembly from the Columbia district from 1947 to 1965.

He died of a heart attack on June 6, 1983, in Niverville, New York at age 85.

References

1897 births
1983 deaths
Republican Party members of the New York State Assembly
20th-century American politicians